Highway 184 (AR 184, Ark. 184, and Hwy. 184) is an east–west state highway in the Arkansas Delta. The route begins at US Highway 64 (US 64) in Parkin and runs east  to US 64 in Earle. The route is maintained by the Arkansas Department of Transportation (ArDOT).

Route description

Highway 184 begins at US 64 near Parkin Archaeological State Park, a state park dedicated to preserve Indian mounds. The route runs north past the historic Northern Ohio School, crossing the Tyronza River very near its mouth at the St. Francis River before turning east. It passes through agricultural areas, crossing into Crittenden County and crossing the Tyronza River again. Highway 184 enters Earle, a small Delta town with an agricultural economy, before terminating at US 64.

History
The highway was created by the Arkansas State Highway Commission (ASHC) on June 23, 1965 from US 64 in Parkin to the east along a county road. A second route was created from US 64 at Norvell in Crittenden County west across the Tyronza River on May 23, 1973 during a period of highway system expansion. The second highway was created pursuant to Act 9 of 1973 passed by the Arkansas General Assembly. The western route was also extended to the Cross-Crittenden county line during the meeting. Nine months later, the gap was closed between the Norvell route and the county line, creating a continuous highway.

Major intersections

See also

Notes

References

External links

184
Transportation in Cross County, Arkansas
Transportation in Crittenden County, Arkansas